Vincent Chalvon-Demersay (born 23 February 1965) is a French producer. He was born in Paris and is the creator of the animated series Totally Spies, Martin Mystery, Team Galaxy and The Amazing Spiez!. He joined Marathon Media with David Michel in 1999. In 2013, he stepped down as the CEO of Marathon Media for undisclosed "personal reasons".

References

External links 
 

French animators
French animated film directors
French animated film producers
French television directors
Living people
1964 births